James (Jim) Cavallaro is a professor of law and the co-founder and executive director of the University Network for Human Rights. He teaches human rights at Wesleyan University, where he is a director of the Minor in Human Rights Advocacy, as well as the Wesleyan ACTS for Human Rights program. In addition to Wesleyan, Cavallaro frequently teaches at Yale Law School, and the University of California at Los Angeles (UCLA). He also teaches at Columbia Law School and the University of California Berkeley. Prior to launching the University Network, Cavallaro founded the International Human Rights and Conflict Resolution Clinic at the Mills Legal Clinic at Stanford Law School, United States. In 2018, Cavallaro and colleagues founded the University Network for Human Rights, an organization that engages undergraduates and graduate students and their universities in human rights work in the United States and around the world. Cavallaro served as a commissioner (2014-2017) and President (2016-2017) of the Inter-American Commission on Human Rights. Cavallaro received his BA from Harvard University and his JD from University of California at Berkeley School of Law, where he served on the California Law Review and graduated with Order of the Coif honors. He also holds a doctorate in human rights and development from Pablo de Olavide University, Seville, Spain.

Career in practice 
Early in his career, Cavallaro spent several years working with Central American refugees on the U.S.-Mexican border and with human rights groups in Chile challenging abuses by the Pinochet government. In 1994, he opened a joint office for Human Rights Watch and the Center for Justice and International Law (CEJIL) in Rio de Janeiro and served as Director of the office, overseeing research, reporting and litigation against Brazil before the Inter-American system's human rights bodies. In 1999, he founded the Global Justice Center, which is now a leading Brazilian human rights nongovernmental organization. Cavallaro authored or co-authored a number of reports on rights in Latin America, including: "Frontier Injustice: Human Rights Abuses Along the U.S. Border with Mexico Persist Amid Climate of Impunity", (Human Rights Watch Short Report, 1993); Police Brutality in Urban Brazil (New York, Human Rights Watch 1997);  Extrajudicial, Summary or Arbitrary Executions: An Approximation of the Situation in Brazil (Editora Gajop 2001); Behind Bars in Brazil (Human Rights Watch, 1998).

Academia and teaching 
Cavallaro joined Harvard Law School in 2002. In 2004, he was appointed clinical director of the Human Rights Program, and then went on to serve as the executive director of the program from 2007 to 2011. In 2011, Cavallaro joined the faculty of Stanford Law School and was appointed Director of the International Human Rights and Conflict Resolution Clinic at the Mills Legal clinic.

Publications and research interests 
Cavallaro is the author of scores of books, reports, and articles on human rights issues. Among his recent scholarly works are: Doctrine, Practice, and Advocacy in the Inter-American Human Rights System (forthcoming November 2018).Reevaluating Regional Human Rights Litigation in the Twenty-First Century: the Case of the Inter-American Court (2008); "Looking Backward to Address the Future?: Transitional Justice, Rising Crime and Nation-Building" (2008); and "Never Again?:The Legacy of the Argentine and Chilean Dictatorships for the Global Human Rights Regime" (2008). Cavallaro has written or overseen a number of policy studies and advocacy texts on human rights, including: "Breach of Faith: Persecution of the Ahmadiyya Community in Bangladesh", (Human Rights Watch Short Report, Brad Adams & James L. Cavallaro eds., 2005); "Keeping the Peace in Haiti?: An Assessment of the United Nations Stabilization Mission in Haiti Using Compliance with its Prescribed Mandate as a Barometer for Success", HLS Advocates for Human Rights/Global Justice Center James L. Cavallaro ed., 2005; Crime, Public Order, and Human Rights (International Council on Human Rights Policy, 2003). Cavallaro has also published widely in Spanish and Portuguese. Cavallaro's work focuses primarily on human rights issues in Latin America, Inter-American human rights systems, international human rights law and practice, and the human rights movement. Cavallaro has published opinion pieces on the CIA role in torture, drone strikes, on the global refugee crisis, and Inter-American Commission, among other issues of social justice and human rights.

Inter-American Commission on Human Rights Nomination 
On February 14, 2023, the Biden administration withdrew Cavallaro's nomination to the Inter-American Commission on Human Rights, citing his criticism of Israel as an apartheid state and Tweets Cavallaro made characterizing House Minority Leader Hakeem Jeffries as “Bought. Purchased. Controlled,” by pro-Israel lobbying groups like AIPAC and Pro-Israel America, the largest single donor to Jeffries's campaign. Pro-Israel groups donated nearly half a million dollars to Jeffries's 2022 campaign, second only to donations from the financial industry.

References

External links

American lawyers
Living people
Harvard University alumni
UC Berkeley School of Law alumni
Stanford Law School faculty
Harvard Law School faculty
Year of birth missing (living people)